The 2019–20 WPBL season is the 29th season of the Russian Women's Basketball Premier League. UMMC Ekaterinburg are the defending champions.

On 16 March 2020, the Russian Basketball Federation temporarily suspended all competitions due to the COVID-19 pandemic. On 27 March, the competition was ended prematurely. UMMC Ekaterinburg were named champions.

First round

Second round

1st–5th place

6th–9th place

Playoffs

Russian clubs in European competitions

References

External links
WPBL Official Website (in Russian)

201819
2019–20 in Russian basketball
Russia